Saeedabadis a neighbourhood in the Karachi West district of Karachi, Pakistan, that previously was a part of Baldia Town until 2011.

There are several ethnic groups in Saeedabad including Muhajirs, Sindhis, Kashmiris, Seraikis, Pakhtuns, Hindu-speaking, Balochis, Brahuis,
Memons, Bohras, Qadir Kutchi and Ismailis.

References
External links

 Karachi Website.

Neighbourhoods of Karachi
Baldia Town